Onaolapo is a given name and surname. Notable people with the name include:

Joy Onaolapo (1983–2013), Nigerian Paralympic weightlifter
Onaolapo Soleye, Nigerian scholar, government minister
Olugbenga Onaolapo Obadara, (born 1960), Nigerian politician and Senator